Guofan Road is a Shanghai Metro station located on Line 10 in Yangpu District, Shanghai. Heading northbound, this will be the last station on the metro line on the Puxi side of the Huangpu River. It was expected to open with the rest of the phase two northern extension of Line 10 in 2018, however, due to construction delays, it opened on 26 December 2020. It will be an underground station with an island platform.

Description 
The station is located at the intersection of Songhu Road and Guofan Road in the New Jiangwan City neighbourhood of Shanghai, within the city's Yangpu District. It is located close to the Jiangwan campus of Fudan University. Due to its proximity to precision instruments located at the university's laboratories, the station was built at a deeper level underground in order to reduce the impact of vibrations from the train tunnels. Another feature of this station unique to the Shanghai Metro network, and also intended to reduce the effect of vibrations, is the use of separated walls in its construction. The theme of the station is one of simplicity, with wind pipes and utility wires hidden inside light fixtures. There are also public art installations inside the station, including a sculpture shaped like an egg and carved with zeros and ones, to indicate Line 10 being the first driverless train line in the city, and as a wordplay with the nearby Fudan University (dan can also mean egg in Chinese).

References 

Railway stations in Shanghai
Shanghai Metro stations in Yangpu District
Line 10, Shanghai Metro
Railway stations in China opened in 2020